Cusio may refer to:

 Cusio, Lombardy, a comune in the Province of Bergamo, Italy
 Lake Orta, a lake in Piedmont, Italy